This is a list of Bulgarian football transfers in the 2010 summer transfer window, sorted by club. Only transfers to and from the A PFG are listed.

Litex

In:

Out:

CSKA Sofia

In:

Out:

Levski Sofia

In:

Out:

Lokomotiv Sofia

In:

Out:

Chernomorets

In:

Out:

Slavia

In:

Out:

Cherno More

In:

Out:

Minyor

In:

Out:

Pirin

In:

Out:

Beroe

In:

Out:

Montana

In:

Out:

Lokomotiv Plovdiv

In:

Out:

Sliven

In:

Out:

Vidima-Rakovski

In:

Out:

Kaliakra

In:

Out:

Akademik

In:

Out:

References

Bulgaria
Summer 2010